Haro is the family name of:

House of Haro, a family of Spanish nobility
Alonso Núñez de Haro y Peralta (1729-1800), Archbishop of Mexico and Viceroy of New Spain
Diego López de Haro (disambiguation)
Fernando Díaz de Haro (Lord of Orduña and Balmaseda) (14th century)
Fernando Ramírez de Haro, 16th Count of Bornos (born 1949)
Fernando Ramírez de Haro, 10th Marquis of Villanueva del Duero (born 1976)
Francisco de Haro (1792–1849), first alcalde (mayor) of Yerba Buena (later named San Francisco, California)
Gaspar Méndez de Haro, 7th Marquis of Carpio (1629-1687), Spanish political figure and art collector 
Gonzalo López de Haro (before 1788–1823), Spanish explorer
Ignacio Ramírez de Haro, 15th Count of Bornos (1918-2010)
Juan de Castilla y Haro (died 1326)
Juan Damián López de Haro (1581-1648), Bishop of Puerto Rico
Juan de Dios de Silva y Mendoza y Haro, 10th Duke of the Infantado (1672-1737)
Juan Domingo de Zuñiga y Fonseca (1640-1716), Spanish military and political figure
Lope Díaz de Haro (disambiguation)
Luis Méndez de Haro (1598-1661), Spanish politician and general 
María Díaz de Haro (disambiguation)
Mécia Lopes de Haro (c. 1217–1270), Queen consort of Portugal
Teresa Díaz de Haro, daughter of Diego López II de Haro, lady of Biscay
Teresa Díaz II de Haro (born before 1254)
Urraca López de Haro (c. 1160-c. 1230), Queen consort of León
Antonio Haro (1910–2002), Mexican fencer
Bob Haro (born 1958), former freestyle BMX rider, artist and business executive, founder of Haro Bikes
Christopher de Haro, Lisbon-based merchant of Flemish origin who financially backed Magellan's 1519 circumnavigation of the world
David García Haro (born 1980), Spanish footballer
Eduardo Haro Tecglen (1924–2005), Spanish journalist, writer and theatre critic
Guillermo Haro (1913–1988), Mexican astronomer
Klaus Härö (born 1971), Finland-Swedish film director
Lauri Härö (1899–1980), Finnish sprinter
Manuel Gaspar Haro (born 1981), Spanish footballer
Mariano Haro (born 1940), Spanish former long-distance runner
Melissa Haro (born 1987), American model
Miguel Nazar Haro (c. 1924–2012), head of Mexico's Dirección Federal de Seguridad (Federal Security Directorate) from 1978 to 1989
Claudia Haro (born ?), American actress convicted of attempted murder on her ex-husband